Hamed Belem born September 24, 1999) is a Burkinabé professional footballer who plays as a right winger for Algerian Ligue Professionnelle 1 club USM Alger.

Club career
On February 6, 2021, Belem joined USM Alger for two and a half year. After the announcement of the failure of the deal by Rahimo FC USMA threatened to go to FIFA, knowing that Belem was wanted by several clubs most notably TP Mazembe and Wydad Casablanca. Belem made his debut on 19 February 2021 as a substitute in a loss against US Biskra, In 17 round against ASO Chlef with the arrival of a new coach Belem made his first as a starter and provided his first assist to Zakaria Benchaâ in 3–0 victory. On March 20, 2021 Belem scored his first goal with his new club against JSM Skikda in 4–1 victory. On May 8, 2021 in the Algiers Derby, Belem suffered a knee injury and after that operated and unavailable for the rest of the season.

International career
Belem was part of Burkina Faso squad at the African Nations Championship, and his first match was against Mali as a substitute after which Belem participated as a starter against Zimbabwe and Cameroon to end the campaign in the group stage.

Career statistics

Club

Honours
Rahimo FC
 Burkinabé Premier League: 2018–19
 Coupe du Faso: 2019
 Burkinabé SuperCup: 2020

References

External links

 
 

Living people
1999 births
People from Bobo-Dioulasso
Burkinabé footballers
Association football wingers
Burkina Faso international footballers
Rahimo FC players
USM Alger players
21st-century Burkinabé people
Burkina Faso A' international footballers
2020 African Nations Championship players
Burkinabé expatriate footballers
Burkinabé expatriate sportspeople in Algeria
Expatriate footballers in Algeria